Erik Alfred Ågren (3 January 1916 – 3 July 1985) was a Swedish amateur boxer. He won a bronze medal in the lightweight division at the 1936 Summer Olympics and a silver medal as a welterweight at the 1939 European Amateur Boxing Championships.

Ågren's three brothers, Carl, Oscar and Ture Ågren, were also elite boxers who competed at the European level.

References

1916 births
1985 deaths
People from Strängnäs Municipality
Lightweight boxers
Olympic boxers of Sweden
Boxers at the 1936 Summer Olympics
Olympic bronze medalists for Sweden
Olympic medalists in boxing
Swedish male boxers
Medalists at the 1936 Summer Olympics
Sportspeople from Södermanland County
20th-century Swedish people